Acraea cinerea, the grey acraea, is a butterfly in the family Nymphalidae which is native to East Africa.

Range
It is found in the Democratic Republic of the Congo, Uganda, Rwanda, Ethiopia, Kenya, Tanzania and Zambia.

Description

A. cinerea Neave. Fore wing diaphanous without a trace of definite spots, at the costal margin and at the apex more or less dusted with grey. Hindwing above uniform black, beneath at the base with a large dark red area, which extends to the apex of the cell and the inner margin; basal dots feebly developed; fore wing beneath dark red at the base of the costal margin. British East Africa: Tiriki Hills (5000 ft.). 
 alberta Eltr. (60 e) differs in the hindwing having above a large, elongate carmine-red spot, which covers the base of cellules 7-2, the middle of cellule 1c and the apex of the cell. To the west of Lake Albert & Edward.

Subspecies
Acraea cinerea cinerea — Democratic Republic of the Congo: east to northern Kivu, Ethiopia, Uganda, Rwanda, Kenya, western Tanzania, Zambia
Acraea cinerea luluae Berger, 1981 — Democratic Republic of the Congo: south to Lualaba

Taxonomy
It is a member of the Acraea masamba species group – but see also Pierre & Bernaud, 2014

References

External links

Images representing  Acraea cinerea luluae at Bold

Butterflies described in 1904
cinerea